Ruditapes largillierti is a saltwater clam, a marine bivalve mollusc in the family Veneridae, the Venus clams. They are moderately large for their genus (45–65 mm long), elongate and subrectangular, thick and solid, with smooth ventral margin.

The species has limited use to people and the seafood industry because it resides in very deep ocean water and contains a very common pearl.

References

 CSIRO
 GNS Science

Veneridae
Commercial molluscs
Bivalves of New Zealand
Bivalves described in 1849